KRI Beladau (643) is a  of the Indonesian Navy. Commissioned in 2013, she is the third ship of her class.

Specifications
The vessel has a length of 44 meters, a draft of 7.4 meters, and a displacement of 250 tonnes with the maximum speed of 27 knots. She has a crew complement of 35, and is equipped with C-705 missiles, a 20mm Denel Vektor GI-2 main gun, and was later fitted with the AK-630 CIWS.

Service history
Beladau was commissioned by Minister of Defense Purnomo Yusgiantoro in Batam on 25 January 2013. She is part of the Indonesian Navy's Western Fleet Command (Koarmabar).

References

2013 ships
Clurit-class fast attack craft